J. Murray Clark is an attorney and former Republican politician from Indiana. He served in the Indiana Senate from 1994 to 2005. He represented the 29th district which consisted portions of Hamilton County and Marion County. Conservative political advocacy group Advance America gave him an 89% rating. He also served as Chairman of the Indiana Republican Party from 2006 to 2010. He was the Republican nominee for lieutenant governor in 2000. He ran alongside David McIntosh. He is a Roman Catholic.

References

External links
 Project Vote Smart – J. Murray Clark (IN) profile
 Our Campaigns – J. Murray Clark (IN) profile
 Office website

1957 births
Living people
State political party chairs of Indiana
Republican Party Indiana state senators
Politicians from Indianapolis
20th-century American politicians
21st-century American politicians